This List of bar associations in Africa includes bar associations in countries in Africa, many of which were members of the International Bar Association .
The East Africa Law Society includes many individual members plus six national Bar associations: Law Society of Kenya, Tanganyika Law Society, Uganda Law Society, Zanzibar Law Society, Kigali Bar Association and Burundi Bar Association.

National Bar Council of South Africa 
www.nationalbarcouncil.co.za

References

Legal organizations based in Africa